Let's Make a Soccer Team!, known in Japan as , is a PlayStation 2 football management game, released by Sega in 2006. Until the worldwide release of SEGA Pocket Club Manager on Android and iOS platform in May 2018, it was the only game in the Pro Soccer Club o Tsukurō! (SakaTsuku for short) series to be localized for the Western market.

Game Information
The game has heavy role-playing video game elements with a running story and characters alongside the more regular management side of the game. Unlike other football management titles, in this game the player are also the chairman and founder of the club.

The game is set around the 2005-06 footballing season, coming off of the league promotion playoffs at the end of the 2004-05 football season. The game story begins with a brief introduction concerning the history of football.

After this, the player is then led to creating their own football club, where the hometown and base of the club is chosen. In total there are six countries the club can be based in: England, France, Germany, Italy, Spain and the Netherlands. While players can create teams based in Wales, Scotland, Northern Ireland and Monaco, they will still play in the English and French league systems, respectively.

After this, the name of the owner of the club, the colour and design of the club kit, the team's playing style and club secretary are chosen. The story then continues.

Following this, the game slides onto a series of newspaper headlines, such as chronicling the formation of the player's team and its rise to the third tier of the respective country's league system. The game officially starts as the playoffs for the 2nd Division of the country which the club is based in begin. If the player's club are knocked out of this tournament, the player gets an early Game Over.

There are three other ways in which the game may end. These are:

Ranking last position in the country's 2nd division two seasons in a row.
Becoming bankrupt financially, causing the club to close down.
The player being unable to provide 16 uninjured and non-tied players for a match.

In addition, the game provides a "Vs. Mode", which plays more like a conventional football game despite only allowing management controls, and allows players to choose teams from outside the six main leagues all over the world, including national teams, for friendly matches and custom tournaments.

Teams created in the main game may be imported to Virtua Pro Football.

Reception
When the game was first released, reception to the game was mixed with most reviewers seemingly either loving or hating it. However, since then, much criticism has aroused, mainly due to the fact the game takes a long period of time to begin its actual story and gameplay. Additionally, similar to the other titles, there is an increased quantity of unlicensed factors in the game.
Nonetheless, the game still has its advocates. The Neo-Seeker forum for LMAST was the second highest used in 2008 (only behind FIFA 2007) and is still used to this day. A tutorial video of the game has 13,000 views on YouTube and there have been a number of campaigns for a sequel. The game was described as 'a slow-building addictive, mesmeric tour de force of a sporting simulation, which prevails over FIFA, PES and Football Manager.' by game critic Craig Navarro.

External links
Official site (in Japanese)

References

2006 video games
PlayStation 2 games
PlayStation 2-only games
Association football management video games
Sega video games
Multiplayer and single-player video games
Video games developed in Japan